The lusory attitude is the psychological attitude required of a player entering into the play of a game.  To adopt a lusory attitude is to accept the arbitrary rules of a game in order to facilitate the resulting experience of play.

The term was coined by Bernard Suits in the book The Grasshopper: Games, Life and Utopia, first published in 1978, in which Suits defines the playing of a game as "the voluntary attempt to overcome unnecessary obstacles".  He also offers a fuller definition:

"To play a game is to attempt to achieve a specific state of affairs [prelusory goal], using only means permitted by rules [lusory means], where the rules prohibit use of more efficient in favour of less efficient means [constitutive rules], and where the rules are accepted just because they make possible such activity [lusory attitude]." 
For example, when two individuals play the pen-and-paper game Hangman, they aim to arrive at the same word through contrived means, thereby accepting the lusory attitude required by the game's rules.

See also

 Magic Circle (virtual worlds)

References

Game design